Phyllonorycter lysimachiaeella is a moth of the family Gracillariidae. It is known from Kentucky, Maine and New York in the United States.

The larvae feed on Lysimachia lanceolata. They mine the leaves of their host plant. The mine has the form of a small tentiform mine on the underside of the leaf.

References

lysimachiaeella
Moths of North America
Moths described in 1875